A hall church is a church with a nave and aisles of approximately equal height, often united under a single immense roof. The term was invented in the mid-19th century by Wilhelm Lübke, a pioneering German art historian. In contrast to an architectural basilica, where the nave is lit from above by the clerestory, a hall church is lit by the windows of the side walls typically spanning almost the full height of the interior.

Terms 
In English language, there are two problems of terminology on hall churches:
 The term hall church is ambiguous because the term hall is ambiguous. In some cases, the church of a manor house ("hall") is called a hall church. Regarding the shapes of churches, hall church is also used for large aisleless churches, an entirely different type.
 The obligatory distinction between nave and aisle, which does not exist in other European languages, is inappropriate for many hall churches.

History 
The first churches with naves and aisles of equal height were crypts. The first aisled hall church north of the Alps is St Bartholomew's Chapel at Paderborn, consecrated c.1017.
In western France, there are some Romanesque hall churches with parallel barrel vaults. Poitiers Cathedral is considered to be the first Gothic hall church, and was probably an example for the Gothic hall churches of Westphalia. Most familiar was the construction of aisled hall churches in the late Gothic period, most notably in the areas of Westphalia and upper Saxony.

In the Netherlands and Flanders, most hall churches have no stone vaults under one longitudinal roof, as is typical in Germany, but wooden barrel vaults with separate longitudinal roofs over each nave or aisle.
In England, there are more than a thousand aisled hall churches with wooden barrel or waggon roofs, as well as other kinds of ceilings (see Commons:Category:Hall churches in England by county), though official descriptions do not use the term hall church. In German literature on English medieval architecture, they are mentioned as a frequent type peripherally. 

In Devon, more than 200 churches (or a part of a church) are such aisled halls, forming the majority of all church buildings, there. In parts of Wales, two-vessel halls are a traditional type of churches, as mentioned using terms like "typical two naves" in descriptions by Cadw. In Scotland, some aisled hall churches are Neoclassical buildings, and some aisled Gothic Revival hall churches have been built there transferring medieval English forms.

There are also English hall churches vaulted with stone, such as Temple Church in London, the choir of Bristol Cathedral and the Lady Chapel of Salisbury Cathedral.

Some Gothic Revival churches apply the hall church model, particularly those following German architectural precedents. One example of a neo-Gothic hall church is St. Francis de Sales Church in Saint Louis, Missouri, designed by Viktor Klutho and completed in 1908.

A completely separate 20th-century usage employs the term hall church to mean a multi-purpose building with moveable seats rather than pews and a chancel area which can be screened off, to allow use as a community centre during the week.  This was particularly popular in Britain in inner city areas from the 1960s onwards.

Principles and variations 
Some typical forms of hall churches and how to distinguish them from basilicas:

Various floorplans of hall churches:

See also 
 Church hall

Further information 
Lists of almost all hall churches of Europe are available on French Wikipedia (incomplete for Germany) and German Wikipedia. The listed churches are identical with the national lists in Czech, Dutch (for the Netherlands and Belgium), Polish, Portuguese and Spanish Wikipedias.

References 

Church architecture
!